Kenninghall Road Mill  is a Grade II listed tower mill at East Harling, Norfolk, England which has been converted to residential accommodation.

History

The mill was probably built in 1820. It first appeared in the Land Tax records in that year, owned by Thomas Burlingham. The mill was offered for sale by auction on 8 August 1943 at the Swan Inn, East Harling. Thomas Jary was the tenant miller at the time. The mill had been taken by James Lawrence by 1850. The mill was again offered for sale by auction on 11 February 1854 at the Swan Inn. James Lawrence retired in 1875 and the mill was taken by his son Thomas. He employed two brothers by the name of Pattinson, who were at the mill by 1902. In 1912, Thomas Lawrence committed suicide in the mill, hanging himself. In 1913, the mill was bought by Christopher Pattinson, who was also running the post mill at Garboldisham. The mill was last worked in 1919 but milling continued for a further three years by oil engine. This was located in a shed some way from the mill and powered a single pair of millstones.

Over the years, the mill was stripped of its sails and machinery. In 1974, the mill tower was refurbished, a new cap made and fitted with the windshaft from Topcroft Mill. In 1984, Breckland District Council granted planning permission for the mill to be converted for residential use.

Description

Kenninghall Road Mill is a four storey tower mill with a domed cap which was winded by a six bladed fantail. The mill had four double Patent sails. The mill had two pairs of French Burr millstones.

Millers

Thomas Burlingham 1820-22
John Waters 1823
Thomas Burlingham 1824-25
J Wright 1826-28
George Kent 1829-31
John Bream 1832
Thomas Jary 1843-46
James Lawrence 1850-75
Thomas Clarence Lawrence 1875-1912
Christopher Gerorge Pattinson 1902-12
Pattinson 1902-12
Christopher George Pattinson 1913-19

References for above:-

References

External links
Windmill World webpage on Kenninghall Road Mill.

Windmills in Norfolk
Tower mills in the United Kingdom
Grinding mills in the United Kingdom
Windmills completed in 1820
Grade II listed buildings in Norfolk
Grade II listed windmills